Mynyddcerrig is a village in Carmarthenshire, Wales. 
Mynyddcerrig once had a primary school, Ysgol Mynyddcerrig, which closed in 2007, however, it still has a working men's club and a public park.

Notable people 
Nigel Owens, Welsh rugby referee 
Bernard Dix, British trade unionist

References 

Villages in Carmarthenshire